The Arrows A19 was the car with which the Arrows Formula One team competed in the 1998 Formula One season.  It was driven by Pedro Diniz, who was in his second season with the team, and Mika Salo, who had moved from Tyrrell to replace Jordan-bound Damon Hill.

Development
Tom Walkinshaw had persuaded John Barnard to join the team as technical director the previous year, and he set to work on the next car.  was a year of unfulfilled promise from Arrows. The cars looked highly distinctive with an almost completely black livery. The car's main weakness was its engine. Walkinshaw explained the move as a chance to push the team's engineering further forward and to cut costs on paying for customer engines. However, Hart's budget was not enough to compete with the major car manufacturers who supplied most of the other teams, and the problems were exacerbated by the car not being completed on time. Barnard had designed a carbon fibre gearbox for the A19, but it proved troublesome throughout the year, affecting results. Barnard was also moonlighting, designing parts for Prost, which did not endear him to Walkinshaw. By the end of the season, Barnard had left the team, replaced by Mike Coughlan.

Race history
The A19 proved to be quite unreliable throughout the season, particularly in the first few Grands Prix, culminating in an embarrassing simultaneous engine failure at the 1998 Spanish Grand Prix.  However, the next race at Monaco proved the effectiveness of the chassis: on a circuit where engine power is not so vital, the cars were competitive and scored a double-points finish.  Thereafter, the cars were too slow and unreliable to be serious contenders, although Diniz salvaged fifth place at the chaotic 1998 Belgian Grand Prix. During the same weekend, Salo destroyed his car during the Saturday practice session at Eau Rouge.

The poor performance of the Hart engine caused Tom Walkinshaw to look for an alternative. Discussions for a deal with Toyota came to nothing and with Barnard leaving in December and an attempted sale to Zakspeed falling through, Arrows were forced to soldier on in 1999.

The team eventually finished a respectable seventh in the Constructors' Championship, with six points.

Complete Formula One results
(key) (results in bold indicate pole position)

References
AUTOCOURSE 1998-99, Henry, Alan (ed.), Hazleton Publishing Ltd. (1998) 

A19
1998 Formula One season cars